Compound chocolate is a product made from a combination of cocoa, vegetable fat and sweeteners. It is used as a lower-cost alternative to true chocolate, as it uses less-expensive hard vegetable fats such as coconut oil or palm kernel oil in place of the more expensive cocoa butter. It may also be known as "compound coating" or "chocolatey coating" when used as a coating for candy. It is often used in less expensive chocolate bars to replace enrobed chocolate on a product.

Cocoa butter must be tempered to maintain gloss and coating. Compound coatings, however, do not need to be tempered.

See also
Polyglycerol polyricinoleate (PGPR) an emulsifier made from castor beans commonly used in compound chocolate
Types of chocolate

References

Types of chocolate